Sport Clube Humaitá, commonly referred to as Humaitá, is a Brazilian professional club based in Porto Acre, Acre. They play in the Série D, the fourth tier of Brazilian football, as well as in the Campeonato Acreano, the top flight of the Acre state football league.

Founded in 2005, it was only professionalized in 2015 to compete for the State Second Division. In 2016, Humaitá were champions of the second division of Campeonato Acriano.

Honours
 Campeonato Acreano
 Winners (1): 2022

 Campeonato Acreano Second Division
 Winners (1): 2016

References

External links 
 Official Facebook 

Football clubs in Acre (state)
2003 establishments in Brazil
Association football clubs established in 2003